William C. Kahl (1908 – 2001) was an American educator.

Kahl was born September 21, 1908 at Mount Horeb, Wisconsin. Kahl graduated from the University of Wisconsin–Madison. He then was a teacher and principal at various schools. In 1966, Kahl was appointed Wisconsin Superintendent of Public Instruction. Kahl was then elected to the office, serving until 1973.

He died February 7, 2001.

Notes

1908 births
2001 deaths
People from Mount Horeb, Wisconsin
University of Wisconsin–Madison alumni
Educators from Wisconsin
Superintendents of Public Instruction of Wisconsin
20th-century American politicians